This article contains lists of tourist attractions in Switzerland.

List
Swiss Inventory of Cultural Property of National and Regional Significance (list of monuments)
List of World Heritage Sites in Switzerland
List of castles and fortresses in Switzerland
List of cathedrals in Switzerland
List of Christian monasteries in Switzerland
List of museums in Switzerland
List of botanical gardens in Switzerland
List of railway museums in Switzerland
List of heritage railways and funiculars in Switzerland
List of mountain railways in Switzerland
List of highest railway stations in Switzerland
List of funiculars in Switzerland
List of aerial tramways in Switzerland
List of mountains of Switzerland accessible by public transport
List of ski areas and resorts in Switzerland
List of highest paved roads in Switzerland
List of highest road passes in Switzerland
Nature parks in Switzerland
List of federal hunting reserves in Switzerland
List of mire landscapes in Switzerland
List of waterfalls of Switzerland
List of mountain lakes of Switzerland
List of caves in Switzerland

See also
Tourism in Switzerland